My Sweet Canary (Greek: Καναρίνι μου Γλυκό) is a French-Greek-Israeli-German documentary film from 2011 about the life of Jewish-Greek rebetiko singer Roza Eskenazi. Its director is the Israeli Roy Sher. In the movie, Martha Demeteri Lewis, Tomer Katz and Mehtap Demir, three young musicians, look for the most famous singers of rebetiko and especially with the intention of learning more about the music career of Roza Eskenazi, as they travel between London, Jerusalem, Corinth, Istanbul, Athens and Salonika.

Music
The music of the film is sung by the Israeli Yasmin Levy, the Greeks Maria Koti, Martha D Lewis, Sotiris Papatragiannis and the Turkish Mehtap Demir. In the film also participate the Greek singer Haris Alexiou, the Israeli Tomer Katz, playing the oud and the bouzouki and the Turkish Mumin Sesler, playing the kanun.

The film was presented in the Thessaloniki International Film Festival.

References

External links

Documentary films about singers
Israeli documentary films
Rebetiko
Documentary films about women in music
2011 films
2011 documentary films
Documentary films about Jews and Judaism